Bayes' theorem may refer to:

Theorem 
 Bayes' theorem - a theorem which expresses how a subjective degree of belief should rationally change to account for evidence.

The application of the theorem  
  Bayesian theory in E-discovery - the application of Bayes' theorem in legal evidence diagnostics and E-discovery, where it provides a way of updating the probability of an event in the light of new information.
 Bayesian theory in marketing - the application of Bayes' theorem in marketing, where it allows for decision making and market research evaluation under uncertainty and limited data.